De Klem is a hamlet in the Dutch province of South Holland and is part of the municipality of Hoeksche Waard. De Klem lies 3 km from the town of Strijen.

De Klem is not a statistical entity, and considered part of Strijen and Numansdorp. It has place name signs, and consists of about 30 houses.

References

Populated places in South Holland
Hoeksche Waard